The Roman Catholic Diocese of Keta–Akatsi is a suffragan Latin diocese in the Ecclesiastical province of Accra in Ghana, yet still depends on the missionary Roman Congregation for the Evangelization of Peoples.

The bishops' seat is Christ the King Cathedral, in Akatsi. The diocese also contains a co-cathedral: St. Michael's Cathedral, in the city of Keta.

History 
It was established on March 15, 1923 as Apostolic Vicariate of Lower Volta (Volta Inférieur/Inferiore), on territories split off from the Apostolic Vicariate of Gold Coast (Ghana) and Apostolic Vicariate of Togo (in Togo) .
It was then promoted on April 18, 1950 as Diocese of Keta.
It lost territory on 1956.04.23 to establish Diocese of Navrongo.
On June 20, 1975 it was renamed as Diocese of Keta–Ho.
It was again renamed on December 19, 1994 as Diocese of Keta–Akatsi, having lost territories to establish Diocese of Ho and Diocese of Jasikan.

Statistics 
As per 2014, it pastorally served 134,600 Catholics (15.4% of 875,000 total) on 7,470 km² in 12 parishes and 6 missions with 55 priests (49 diocesan, 6 religious), 27 lay religious (6 brothers, 21 sisters) and 34 seminarians.

Bishops

Episcopal ordinaries
(all Roman rite; until 1976, European missionary members of Latin congregations, when the then auxiliary bishop was appointed as ordinary)

Apostolic Vicars of Lower Volta
 Augustin Hermann, Society of African Missions (S.M.A.) (born France) (1923.03.26 – death 1945.04.08), Titular Bishop of Bubastis (1923.03.26 – 1945.04.08)
 Joseph Gerald Holland, S.M.A.  (born England, UK)(1946.07.11 – 1950.04.18 see below), Titular Bishop of Ammædara (1946.07.11 – 1950.04.18)

Suffragan Bishops of Keta
 Joseph Gerald Holland, S.M.A. (see above 1950.04.18 – retired 1953.05.07), emeritate as Titular Bishop of Cynopolis in Ægypto (1953.05.07 – resigned 1970.12.07), died 1972
 Antoon Konings, S.M.A. (born Netherlands) (1954.02.21 – 1975.06.20 see below), previously Apostolic Administrator of daughter diocese Ho (Ghana) (1953 – 1954.02.21 see below)

Suffragan  Bishops of Keta–Ho
 Antoon Konings, S.M.A. (see above 1975.06.20 – retired 1976.04.10), died 1981
 Francis Anani Kofi Lodonu (first native incumbent) (1976.04.10 – 1994.12.19), also President of Ghana Bishops’ Conference (1991–1997); next Bishop of Ho (Ghana) (1994.12.19 – retired 2015.07.14); previously Titular Bishop of Mascula (1973.05.17 – 1976.04.10) as Auxiliary Bishop of Keta–Ho (1973.05.17 – succession 1976.04.10)

Suffragan Bishops of Keta-Akatsi
 Anthony Kwami Adanuty, Divine Word Missionaries (S.V.D.) (1994.12.19 - 2016.04.07); stayed  on a while as Apostolic Administrator (2016.04.07 – 2017.03.16)
 Gabriel Edoe Kumordji, S.V.D. (2017.03.16 – ...); previously Apostolic Prefect of Donkorkrom (Ghana) (2007.06.12 – 2010.01.19), next promoted Titular Bishop of Ita (2010.01.19 – 2017.03.16) as first Apostolic Vicar of Donkorkrom (2010.01.19 – 2017.03.16).

Auxiliary Bishop
 Francis Anani Kofi Lodonu (1973-1976), appointed Bishop here

See also
 List of Catholic dioceses in Ghana
 Roman Catholicism in Ghana

Sources and external links 
 Official website 
 GCatholic.org - data for all sections
 Catholic Hierarchy

Roman Catholic dioceses in Ghana
Dioceses in Ghana
Religious organizations established in 1923
Roman Catholic dioceses and prelatures established in the 20th century
Roman Catholic Ecclesiastical Province of Accra